The Merry Farmer (German: Der fidele Bauer) is a 1951 Austrian musical comedy film directed by Georg Marischka and starring Paul Hörbiger, Erich Auer, Heinrich Gretler. An operetta film, it is an adaptation of the 1907 operetta The Merry Farmer composed by Leo Fall.

It was shot at the Sievering Studios in Vienna. The film's sets were designed by the art director Gustav Abel.

Cast
 Paul Hörbiger as Matthias Scheichelroither  
 Erich Auer as Heini Scheichelroither  
 Heinrich Gretler as Lindoberer  
 Franz Marischka as Vinzenz Lindoberer  
 Rudolf Carl as Raudaschl  
 Helli Servi as Annamirl Raudaschl  
 Elisabeth Karlan as Resi Scheichelroither  
 Marianne Wischmann as Vivian Harrison  
 Alma Seidler as Mrs. Harrison  
 Adrienne Gessner as Frau Holefka  
 Ulrich Bettac as Mr. Harrison  
 Karli Obrich as Heinerle als Kind 
 Fritz von Friedl as Vinzenz als Kind  
 Loni von Friedl as Annamirl als Kind  
 Hans Hais as Napoleon im Film  
 Karl Eidlitz as Talleyrand im Film 
 Gertrude Decombe 
 Erich Dörner 
 Karl Ehmann as Lehrer  
 C.W. Fernbach 
 Anton Gaugl 
 Karl Günther 
 Fritz Heller 
 Egon von Jordan 
 Fritz Muliar as Kinobesucher  
 Johannes Roth 
 Emmerich Schrenk 
 Hans Steilau

References

Bibliography 
 Fritsche, Maria. Homemade Men in Postwar Austrian Cinema: Nationhood, Genre and Masculinity. Berghahn Books, 2013.

External links 
 

1951 films
1951 musical comedy films
Austrian musical comedy films
1950s German-language films
Films directed by Georg Marischka
Operetta films
Films based on operettas
Films scored by Leo Fall
Austrian black-and-white films
Films shot at Sievering Studios